Chase Carey (born 22 November 1953) is an Irish-born American executive. He is the former chief executive officer and executive chairman of the Formula One Group.  He has previously worked for News Corp, DIRECTV, 21st Century Fox and Sky plc.

Early life
Carey was born in Ireland to American parents of Irish descent, and received his bachelor's degree from Colgate University and an MBA from Harvard, where he was a member of the Harvard Business School Rugby Club. While attending Colgate he joined the Delta Upsilon fraternity and was a member of the Colgate University Rugby Football Club. Today, Carey is a Trustee Emeritus of Colgate University.

Career

Early career with Fox
Carey first came to work with Fox, a News Corporation holding, in 1988.  Over the course of the following decade he served as COO of Fox, Inc., and CEO of Fox Broadcasting Company. During this time he helped launch both Fox Sports and Fox News and helped form a partnership between Fox Network and the NFL, a deal worth $1.58 billion.

He also served as co-COO of News Corporation, along with Peter Chernin. He resigned as co-COO of News Corp on January 24, 2002.

DirecTV
During the time that Carey was working for News Corp, the company purchased a 34% controlling interest in Hughes Electronics, which at the time owned DirecTV, a satellite TV provider.  Carey had already served on the DirecTV board of directors, and in 2003 he was appointed CEO.

At DirecTV, Carey had plans to add 1 million new subscribers a year, and had met that goal when he left the company six years later. Carey's tenure at DirecTV was widely considered successful, and the company returned to profitability.

In 2006, News Corporation sold its controlling interest in DirecTV to Liberty Media, in exchange for News Corp shares.

Return to News Corporation
In June 2009, it was announced that Carey would be leaving DirecTV and returning to News Corp. He assumed the posts of President and COO that had been held by Chernin, as well as the post of Deputy Chairman.

In August 2011 Rupert Murdoch tipped Carey to be his successor as CEO of News Corporation. It was previously assumed that Murdoch's son James would succeed him. In 2013, Carey was announced as the COO of 21st Century Fox, the legal successor of News Corporation and the owner of most of its film and television properties, News Corporation's print media and Australian assets being spun off as News Corp. In 2015, Carey was reassigned as executive co-chairman, while James Murdoch became CEO. Carey resigned this position in July 2016 to become a consultant to Fox.

In 2019, he was on the Fox Corporation board.

Formula One
On 23 January 2017, Carey was installed as CEO and Executive chairman of Formula One Group after Liberty Media completed their acquisition of the Formula One Group.

On September 25th, 2020 Liberty Media announced that Carey would take on the role of non-executive chairman with Stefano Domenicali stepping in as CEO as of January, 2021. Carey’s achievements included the establishment of a cost cap for the first time in Formula 1 and the signing of a more equitable Concorde Agreement with the teams from 2021 to 2025.

References

External links
Profile at Bloomberg Businessweek
Profile and collected coverage at Forbes
Collected coverage at The Wall Street Journal

Campaign contributions at Newsmeat.com and at FundRace
Forbes Profile
Business Week Interview

1953 births
Living people
American chief executives
American chief operating officers
American television executives
Auto racing executives
Colgate University alumni
Formula One people
Harvard Business School alumni
News Corporation people
 American people of Irish descent